The high-resolution dynamics limb sounder (HIRDLS) is an instrument on board the NASA Aura. It follows in the heritage of LRIR (Nimbus-6), LIMS and SAMS (Nimbus-7), ISAMS and CLAES (UARS). It was designed to observe global distribution of temperature and concentrations of O3, H2O, CH4, N2O, NO2, HNO3, N2O5, CFC-11, CFC-12, ClONO2, and aerosols in the upper troposphere, stratosphere, and mesosphere.

After launch, activation of the HIRDLS instrument revealed that the optical path was blocked so that only 20% of the aperture could view the Earth's atmosphere. Engineering studies suggest that a piece of thermal blanketing material ruptured from the back of the instrument during the explosive decompression of launch. Attempts to remove this material mirror failed. However, even with the 80% blockage, measurements at high vertical resolution can be made at one scan angle. HIRDLS failed in March 2008.

See also
Atmospheric chemistry observational databases
International Global Atmospheric Chemistry
Microwave limb sounder

References

External links
 NASA Aura HIRDLS page.

Atmospheric sounding satellite sensors